Jedlina-Zdrój  is a spa town in Wałbrzych County, Lower Silesian Voivodeship, in south-western Poland. It is located within the historic region of Lower Silesia.

As of 2019, the town has a population of 4,828.

History

The oldest mention of Jedlinka dates back to the 13th century, to the reign of Duke Bolko I the Strict of the Polish Piast dynasty. It was a settlement of lumberjacks, and its name refers to the fir forests growing here. In the 18th century a mineral spa was founded in the Jedlinka estate. It was named Charlottenbrunn by its founder in honour of his wife Charlotte von Seherr-Thossa. In 1737 a spa house and other buildings were built. Later on, the village became a centre of textile trade. Four fairs a year took place here. In 1742 the settlement was annexed by the Kingdom of Prussia. In 1768 it was granted town rights. In the 19th century the spa town often changed its owners, which slowed its development. In the interwar period there were six hotels and about 30 pensions in the town. During World War II, in 1944, the Germans established a labor camp, which was a branch of the Gross-Rosen concentration camp, in the town. After Nazi Germany's defeat in World War II the town became once again part of Poland and was renamed Jedlina-Zdrój. The suffix "Zdrój" is typical for names of spa towns in Poland.

Twin towns – sister cities

Jedlina-Zdrój is twinned with:
 Saint-Étienne-de-Crossey, France
 Strehla, Germany
 Velichovky, Czech Republic

Gallery

References

Cities and towns in Lower Silesian Voivodeship
Wałbrzych County
Cities in Silesia
Spa towns in Poland